Locke Lake is a  water body located in Belknap County in central New Hampshire, United States, in the town of Barnstead. It is fed by Halfmoon Lake and drained by Webster Stream. It is surrounded by the Locke Lake Colony, a private development. There is no public access to the lake.

The lake is part of the Suncook River watershed, flowing south to the Merrimack River.

References

External links
Locke Lake Colony

Lakes of Belknap County, New Hampshire
Lakes of New Hampshire